Kamionka Mała may refer to the following places:
Kamionka Mała, Limanowa County in Lesser Poland Voivodeship (south Poland)
Kamionka Mała, Nowy Sącz County in Lesser Poland Voivodeship (south Poland)
Kamionka Mała, Masovian Voivodeship (east-central Poland)